Two Embarcadero Center is an office skyscraper located off The Embarcadero in the financial district of San Francisco, California. The , 30-story tower, completed in 1974 is part of the Embarcadero Center, a complex of seven towers, of which two are hotels. Twin-tower Three Embarcadero Center is the same height, but has one additional floor.

Tenants
One Medical Group
Macquarie Group

See also
 San Francisco's tallest buildings

References

Further reading

External links
 Embarcadero Center official web site

Buildings and structures completed in 1974
Financial District, San Francisco
John C. Portman Jr. buildings
Skyscraper office buildings in San Francisco
Twin towers